The Motherland Party, sometimes also referred to as Mongolian Democratic New Socialist Party is a political party in Mongolia. It was founded by the owner of the Erel group, Badarchiin Erdenebat. There is a considerable overlap between employees of the Erel group and members of the Motherland party, and the party is popularly also known as Erel party. The party was a member of the 2004 Motherland Democratic Coalition, and held four seats in the State Great Khural from 2004 to 2008. It failed to win any seats in the 2008 parliamentary elections. From 2006 to 2007, the party also held two seats in government: Badarchiin Erdenebat was Minister for Fuel and Resources, and I. Erdenebaatar was Minister for the Environment.

1992 establishments in Mongolia
Political parties established in 1992
Political parties in Mongolia
Social democratic parties in Asia
Socialism in Mongolia